David Hiram Baker (February 26, 1939 – December 2, 2009) was an American animal nutritionist who was elected to the United States National Academy of Sciences in 2005. Baker is professor emeritus of animal sciences and nutritional sciences at the University of Illinois at Urbana-Champaign.

In 1987, he received the National Academy of Sciences' Distinguished Service Award.

Education
Baker earned a Ph.D. degree from the University of Illinois at Urbana-Champaign in 1965; his thesis was titled Qualitative and Quantitative Evaluation of the Amino Acid Needs of Adult Swine for Maintenance. He then spent two years as a senior scientist with the Eli Lilly and Company in Indianapolis, Indiana, then returned to join the University of Illinois at Urbana-Champaign faculty in the Department of Animal Sciences and Division of Nutritional Sciences, where he remained for the rest of his career.

Baker published 510 peer-reviewed papers, mainly in non-ruminant nutrition (i.e., swine and poultry nutrition), with research and teaching emphases on nutritional principles involving amino acids, minerals, vitamins, and other nutrients.

References

External links 

 J. E. Pettigrew, R. N. Dilger, J. W. Erdman, Jr., C. M. Parsons, R. A. Easter, S. M. Donovan, and D. E. Bauman, "David H. Baker", Biographical Memoirs of the National Academy of Sciences (2015)

Animal nutritionists
University of Illinois faculty
University of Illinois College of Agriculture, Consumer, and Environmental Sciences alumni
Members of the United States National Academy of Sciences

1939 births
2009 deaths